Dichromodes estigmaria is a moth of the  family Geometridae. It is found in Australia.

References 

Oenochrominae
Moths described in 1861